For people with the surname, see Altès (surname).

In Greek mythology, Altes was a Lelegian king who resided at Pedasus, which was situated in or near the Troad.  According to Homer's Iliad Altes was the father of Laothoe, one of the many wives of King Priam.  In other accounts, Altes is also said to be the father of the Argonaut Ancaeus of Samos; perhaps because this Ancaeus was also of Lelegian stock.  The parentage of Altes is not given by the ancient mythographers.

Notes

Kings in Greek mythology

References 

 Homer, The Iliad with an English Translation by A.T. Murray, Ph.D. in two volumes. Cambridge, MA., Harvard University Press; London, William Heinemann, Ltd. 1924. . Online version at the Perseus Digital Library.
 Homer, Homeri Opera in five volumes. Oxford, Oxford University Press. 1920. . Greek text available at the Perseus Digital Library.